Storer House may refer to:

in the United States
(by state)
 Storer House (Los Angeles, California), listed on the NRHP in California
 Storer House (Kosciusko, Mississippi), listed on the NRHP in Mississippi